Radikal Records is a Teaneck, New Jersey based independent record label launched in 1990 by Jurgen Korduletsch for the purpose of introducing European dance, techno, rave and trance music to the United States. Radikal has released a "who's who" of European dance royalty and continues to sign and release electronic music, some pop music, and many compilation albums. Many of their artists and releases were and are licensed from all over the world for exclusive release in North America. Radikal Records sells their releases via their company website, all major music retailers, and all major music download sites. All of their current releases can be sampled through the website. Currently, in-print releases are distributed in the United States by RED Distribution.

Notable artists
2 Unlimited
4 Clubbers
4 Strings
Afrika Bambaataa
Agnelli & Nelson
Alex Party
André Tanneberger
Antoine Becks
Apollo 440
Armin van Buuren
Audio Playground
Ayah Marar
Bart Claessen
Black Duck
Blank & Jones
Bombs Away
Bonnie Anderson
Brooklyn Bounce
Claudja Barry
Cosmic Gate
Cygnus X
Da Hool
Dannic
Dannii Minogue
DJ Aligator Project
DJs from Mars
Energy 52
Eve Gallagher
Fargetta
George Kranz
Gloria Gaynor
I.O.U.
Jason Nevins
Juliet Roberts
Junior Jack
Kamaliya
Kingsland Road
Klubbheads
Kristian Nairn
Lucas Nord
Mad'House
Marc et Claude
Matt Cardle
Mauro Picotto
MC Mario
Mellow Trax
Milk & Sugar
N-Trance
Paffendorf
Playahitty
Pulsedriver
Ralphie Dee
Rozalla
Schiller
Scooter
Sinéad O'Connor
Snap!
Sunscreem
Tony Moran
The Underdog Project
U96 / Wolfgang Flür
Voodoo and Serano
Wideboys
Yello
Zombie Nation

External links
 Official page
 Discogs release list

American record labels
Record labels established in 1992
Electronic dance music record labels
Pop record labels